The Great Shake is the fourth studio album by the Italian band Planet Funk, released on 20 September 2011.

Track listing 
 "All Your Love"
 "Another Sunrise"
 "The Great Shake"
 "How Should I Know"
 "Just Another Try"
 "Live It Up"
 "Ora il mondo è perfetto" (featuring Giuliano Sangiorgi)
 "The Other Side"
 "You Remain"

Charts

References

2011 albums
Planet Funk albums